Budinci (Prekmurje Slovene: Büdinci) is a dispersed village in the Municipality of Šalovci in the Prekmurje region of Slovenia.

The northernmost tip of Slovenia is within the village's territory to the northwest of the main settlement with a latitude of 46° 52′ 37″.

There is a simple two-storey belfry in the southeastern part of the settlement, opposite the cemetery. It dates to the first half of the 20th century.

References

External links 
 Budinci on Geopedia
 

Populated places in the Municipality of Šalovci
Hungary–Slovenia border crossings